Collingwood County was one of the counties of New Zealand on the South Island.

During the period 1853 to 1876, the area that would become Collingwood County was administered as part of Nelson Province. With the Abolition of Provinces Act 1876, Collingwood County was created, taking over administration of its area on 1 January 1877.

In 1903, the Government of New Zealand voted to reduce the size of Collingwood County to just its western Aorere region, with the remaining eastern region being constituted as Takaka County, effective April 1904. The two counties were re-amalgamated in 1956 to form Golden Bay County.

Golden Bay County existed until the 1989 local government reforms, when it was amalgamated into the new Tasman District.

References

Counties of New Zealand
Tasman District